Reidenbach Old Order Mennonites, also called Thirty-Fivers, comprise about 15 Old Order Mennonite churches, who emerged from a split of the Groffdale Old Order Mennonite Conference in 1942 and subsequent splits. The people who formed the Reidenbach Mennonites Church were more conservative than the members of the Groffdale Conference. The original name of the new church in 1946 was "Reidenbach Mennonite Church".

History 

During World War II around the year 1942 there was a conflict among the Groffdale Conference Mennonites about the question if members of the Conference should send their male youth to government-run Civilian Public Service camps or if the young males should rather go to jail. Dozens of members refrained therefore from communion and many of them tried to join other likeminded groups. After some years 35 of these about 60 church members who opted against Civilian Public Service camps on May 30, 1946, formed a separate church and built a meetinghouse in 1947 close to Reidenbach, an unofficial place name in Earl Township, Lancaster County, Pennsylvania where there is a Reidenbach Road. Since then they became known as Thirty-Fivers, Fimfunddreissiger, Reidenbachers, Reidenbach Mennonites or after their many divisions got new names after leaders, influential members, patriarchs or bishops. The Thirty-Fivers naming still dominates and even is used by themselves.

Their later history is characterized by a long series of splits, the major one being a division in 1977 about the use of bottled gas, which left the 158 members in two groups, one of 90 members, the John J. Martin group, who forbade bottled gas, and one of 68 members, the Amos Martin group, who allowed it. The John J. Martin group later saw several further splits.

Splits 

The table below lists all splits of more than one family until the middle of the year 1996:

The reasons behind these splits have been published in a book, they can for short being described as "The Role of the Worldly Government split" in 1956, "The Bottled Gas" split in 1977, "The Fancy Carriage split" in 1981, "The Holy Kiss among Women split" in late 1985, "The Appointment Question split" in early 1987, "The Matthew, 12,36 Split" in late summer in 1987. These splits created groups of more than one family, separated families have to be added to it which also have a story of splits behind their formations.

Since 1996 some more splits happened and new splinter groups were started, mostly one family units by now.

P.G. the Aaron Z. Martin group had a split in 2004, few years after they had built a meeting house on Wentzel Road, Terre Hill area forming the Wayne H. Martin group. In a short time of five years they were joined by a big part of the Kleine Reidenbach church, grew due to new marriages, built a meeting house and then were joined by the Harvey Z. Martin side of the Henry Hoover church in 2004. That created a split as the old question of "When and if it was right to ordain Aaron in a two weeks´ period after minister Henry was expelled?" was again discussed and created friction. Minister Wayne H. Martin supported Harvey's side now while not objecting to it in 1985 when still with the original group. Finally a new split resulted in 2004.

This new formed group moved down to Kentucky and from a nucleus of around ten families it has now over 27 families, including some converted formerly separated 35er families. Some years after the move this group tried successfully to convince a few still separated 35er families in Lancaster County to join them. Rufus Hoover & wife for example joined them, after 30 years staying alone. There son was meanwhile Prediger (preacher) among the Wayne H. Martin group. Another example is the family of alone standing John H. Hoover at that time. 

The other side of the split in 2004, Aaron Z. Martin´s group also grew but in lower numbers, having not even 2/3 of the memberships of the Wayne H. Martin side.

Other groups dissolved: 
This is valid for the whole of Kleine Reidenbach Gemeinde/Little Reidenbach church and some of their off-splits from the Reiff side. It has been dissolved in the early 2000s after the last two families, neighbors on opposite street sides, separated from each other. The meeting house was in 2017 not anymore used, whose sheds became wood storage room. 
Over the years some talks were about using it, but it stands here as a remnant alone how a church of about 55 members at its best times fell into nothing.
The last families, Leon H. Hoover and its neighbor David Z. Hoover formed one-family-units.

These two families on Snyder Drive, neighboring the church house, were the last members of the Kleine Reidenbach Gemeinde, which started in 1981 and ended in abt. 2000. There are now in 2022 just two groups left over with more than one family. These are the Rufus Z. Martin group and the "Amos W. Hoover group" (at least 3-5 complete families by now). The last group is very much reserved to speak to outsiders, almost xenophobic and closed-up.
It resulted from a split about a case of an outsider, who joined and was not fully accepted by many and finally pushed out verbally.

Also the Henry M. Hoover group dissolved, resulting by an internal movement joining the Gorrie Mennonites. 
Henry M. Hoover, its leader, minister up to his death, finally joined with some families the Orthodox Mennonites of Gorrie, Huron County, Ontario. The Orthodox Mennonites had already one settlement in Trigg County and some of the Henry Hoover group looked for company and fellowship with it.

This had a complete impact on its lifestyle, even outlook: growing full beards, getting outhouses...This had also a positive effect on its growth and for the young people who could find more company beside the closest first cousins and related friends they grew up. The term "Gorrie Fivers" was quoted for this group by some Groffdale Conference neighbors. It fits very much, because some characterics are still distinguishable between them and the Canadians. Over 22 couples could be counted up to 2012 by this union, which have a direct 35er background and are mixed marriages between 35ers and Gorrie people of before.

Some of Henry's group did not join, especially the Harvey Z. Martin side(his former best friend) and united with the Aaron Z. Martin group in Lancaster, which resulted in a new split at that time forming the Wayne H. Martin group(reasons were the fast ordination of Aaron Z. Martin when Henry was expelled as preacher, as written above). This is the current second line stemming from Henry M. Hoover.

And finally the last of his group's families and single persons either joined the Amos Martin branch started in Kentucky at that time or the Groffdale Conference Mennonites.

This dissolution of the Henry Hoover group was a voluntary movement, but led to a split, as they could not hold communion in 2004 about the next steps for the complete church. Its main leader decided to join a bigger Old Order Mennonite group, some followed, others joined other Reidenbach Mennonites groups or even the Wenger Mennonites (Groffdale Conference).

The John Martin group split in 2007, which is described in a book from one side(Mark Z. Hoover: The Inside Story). in 2009/10 one side was called the "strict 35er" (in a news article) or now better Daniel Hoover group. The other side was the Paul F. Martin group(John Martin's son), now led by Mark Martin. 

This split is sometimes called the "Sabbath split", because the arguments started with that expression. There was a tense discussion to what extent the Old Testament is still literally valid today, especially in regard of the laws or just spiritually and what is allowed to express and say and how it has to be handled, when expressed again.

Daniel Hoover's group (or John W. Hoover's group its former name also) moved down to Kentucky after 2010 and built an own meeting house, while the Paul F. Martin branch still used the Old Reidenbach meeting house in 2021. Both groups have about 15 to 20 families by now.

The Daniel M. Hoover group lost two families and a husband with two daughters shortly after they moved down to Kentucky around 2014. These persons joined a separate Amish group, the so-called "Girod-group" of Vevay, Indiana which consisted of only 15 families at that time. This splinter group of 35ers became Amish. The term "Amish Fivers" would classify them well.

Daniel Hoover's group was in an article of 2009 called the "strict 35ers", when there were problems with police about custody of a neighbors´ girl and keeping it hidden. This brought even TV attention. They were just planning moving.

Over the years this group also introduced and supported a very strong policy in separating couples literally after splits. It started when an attachments was built to the bishop's house for a wife whose husband went with the other side after 2007. Wife and husband weren't able to meet without controlling. In 2021 this affected already five couples among them, four due to the 2007 split in which all partners moved down without the other part, in three cases accompanied by their children, one due to a split in Kentucky. There were court trials for visitation rights of the kids in the Kentucky case. Many Old Order groups tried to help and prevent these clashes, but without success.

Beside these new or dissolved groups, many single family units exist, some holding church service in kitchens or living rooms, some just read from the Bible. By now there are some groups whose children reach now the late 40s and never married, had no chance, because their parents (in their eighties now) separated some decades ago and stayed alone for so many years. They followed them and never married.

One should quote also that there was a remarkable growth in two groups:
The Amos Martin group (big church/Gross Gemee) has now at least three settlements and over 75 families. It is the most liberal Reidenbacher church. Certain single families or children of the conservative side from dissolved groups or separated couples even attend their church services, some children joined and intermarried again into their parents´ or grandparents´ mother group. And as above mentioned the Kentucky group around Wayne H. Martin(died 2018), grew up to at least 27 families by now.

The newest, updated list of Reidenbach Mennonites shows eight groups with more than one family belonging to in 2022:

Currently in 2022 there are seven separated Reidenbach Mennonite families (family group members in parenthesis, a "+" indicates one might have to add more):
David M. Hoovers (12), David Z. Hoovers (10), Earl H. Hoovers (9), John Z. Hoovers(2), Jonas H. Hoovers (9+), Leon H. Hoovers (2) and Ben H. Martins (11)

This calculation took in reference that "Unterricht" (Unnerricht in Pennsylvania German, Instruction class for baptism and church membership) normally starts with 18 years when young people start to desire church memberships. There are hardly young people joining after being 20 yrs. Therefore one can assume and count people of 18 years as members. For some families the data are not complete. Many data are from the Muddy Creek Farm Library´s family lists of Mennonites, then Zimmerman Family book as a source, the standard work of Albertsen, requests by letters and interviews.

Church Houses 

Many groups of the Reidenbach Mennonites don´t have separate church houses, but so far known the Reidenbach Mennonite bigger groups have these church houses:

Old bishop Amos Martin´s group, Gross Gemeinde, Gross-Gemay, Big Reidenbach Church:

1) Lancaster County, Pa on Reidenbach Road, corner Martin Road (the original house since 1947, remodeled in 1970)

2) Montour-/Northumberland-County, Pa: Limestone Church, 2nd church (late 1980s)

3) Christian-/ Todd-County, Ky: new built church, Fairview Fulcher Road, close to Morton Road, 3rd church (2019)

Henry Hoover group(dissolved):

1) first church in houses and local parochial school at Hoover Lane, Hopkinsville (1989-2002)

2) then building of Fairview Mennonite church, now used by later groups (2002-2006)

Kleine Reidenbach Gemeinde, Little Reidenbach Church(dissolved):

1) Snyder Drive church house, for years unused, as church dissolved (1981/2-abt 2000)

Aaron Z. Martin group(now Nathan H. Martin bishop)

1) about 14 years house services (1987-2001)

2) then Wentzel Road: Black Creek Mennonite Church (since 2001)

John F. Martin group, Paul F. Martin group:

1) used alternately old church with Amos Martin group, 1977-2007

2) house services, old church building used by Daniel M. Hoover group meanwhile, 2007-2010 

3) after moving of Daniel M. Hoover group down to Kentucky, they became again users of old church house, since 2010

Daniel M. Hoover group:

1) used old church house, shared with big group, 2007-2010

3) house service until church house was built, 2010-2012

2) Grayson County, Ky: Clearfield Mennonite church, since 2012

Wayne Martin group, now Samuel Hoover group:

1) Wentzel Road church: Black Creek Church (shared with Aaron Z. Martin group), 2004-until moving

2) Fairview Mennonite church, Ky shared with Gorrie Mennonites

2) While the church house seems to be of the original size, the sheds for horses have seen attachments twice and now are more than double in length as before.

So at all there are seven Reidenbach Mennonite church houses:

1) Amos Martin group: 3 (one shared)

2) Aaron Z. Martin group: 1 (alone)

3) Daniel M. Hoover group: 1 (alone)

4) Paul F. Martin group: 1(shared with 1))

5) Wayne H. Martin group: 1 (shared with Gorrie M.)

6) Little Reidenbach group: 1 (alone, now closed church house)

Customs and belief 
The belief of the Reidenbach Mennonites almost does not differ much from other Old Order Mennonites, except in the Meidung(shunning) issue and in a greater emphasize of keeping rules.

Reidenbach Mennonites emphasize complete removal of memberships combined with strong shunning in social matters unless Wenger Mennonites, who rather exclude members from taking communion if expelled, but do not shun much socially.

Another issue is their understanding that technological backwardness is a strong helping tool for stepping up the heavenly ladder, keeping and holding on to material rules became very much a matter of salvation: 
One former Henry Hoover Mennonite deacon p.g. expressed to another member, who had a crawler:

Such and other expressions, a strong connection of what's allowed and where it would lead to (hell or heaven) are manifest and solid grounded in their understanding of living a Christian life. Being "zurickhaltig", "humble and backwards minded" in technological areas is very much connected to earning a much more than living hope of salvation. 
This is also valid for the other Old Order Mennonite and Amish groups, but in most instances hardly so openly expressed.

Reidenbach Mennonites have also a feeling of exclusiveness and righteousness: 
Former bishop Amos Martin expressed once:

This is not unique to them, but it gives a reasoning for its group's existence (other churches also define borderlines to other churches and therefore make it sure who is right and who consequently on the other side of the fence...but not so extremely, rather as a quiet kept issue with many inconsequencies if requested).

Old Order Mennonites are not spreading around that they feel saved, are new born etc. (an emotionally based faith), in that sense they see humbleness more important and even doubt these doctrinal interpretations of many mainstream churches, so they deny a doctrine of "once saved, always saved", "give your life to Jesus and you are saved(and nothing more has to be done)", Jesus is also Savior for them, he gave his life for them, but his Sacrifice does not mean to live a life without keeping rules.

Old Order Mennonnites are careful not to take God's doomsday judgements into their own hands (knowing to be saved), but hope he will give salvation to them, they accept their sinfulness until life's end and worthlessness ("Mir sin net würdig fer") for salvation. Consequently, one looks for what can be done to have a stronger hope. Earning salvation by works attitudes grew as a result of emotionally not being certain to get God's grace.
There is one Reidenbach Mennonite group who emphasized (if still nowadays unknown) that just the unjustified would have to give answer on doomsday, while the justified would not need to, this created the Aaron Z. Martin group in 1987. That was so far the closest step to any kind of knowledge of salvation.

Another evidence of the strong connection of keeping rules and having therefore a better hope for salvation is the handling of people who disobey. After admonishings, successless demandings of confessions they are expelled with the words: You are "dem Teufel übergeben zum Verderben deines Fleisches" ("giving over to the devil" (´s side, the world, led by the devil, under control of the devil) for the spoilage of the flesh). The sinner is outcasted figuratively and now outside of God's flock, he shall repent, accept his wrongdoings and there is hope he will obey in future to all these rules and come back and kneel down. This way of expulsion is defined as according to God's will. Being expelled means if staying unrepentable being outside of any hope for salvation, as the church can loose and bind on God's behalf on earth, which will also being accepted in heaven. There is biblical reference for this dealing.

Reidenbach Ordnungen (set of church rules) do not allow cars, rubber wheels on buggies, tractors for fieldwork, TV, radio, telephones and electricity from public lines. 
Pennsylvania German is the language used at home and with other Old Orders, children go to parochial schools and dress is a very conservative form of plain dress at least among the conservative groups. Their Ordnung is more conservative than that of mainstream horse and buggy Old Order Mennonites ("Wenger" and Ontario) but less conservative than the Ordnung of the "Pikers".
All these Ordnung rules serve several issues: keeping a group together, increasing Gemeinschaft, keeping outside influence out, staying faithful to old ways and theology, preventing modern thinking entering (rules of women, in sexual matters, in doctrinal matters, in scientific matters..)

Due to the many split of Reidenbach Mennonites, their Ordnungen differ somewhat nowadays and have gone different ways:  The Ordnung of the Amos Martin group is somewhat relaxed for business men in regard of cell phone ownership and use, it is expected from them to donate more for paying hospital bills because having this privilege. Telephone became allowed for farmers in booths some yards from the houses too.
Also in clothes styles there is a growing difference, while the Daniel Hoover group looks rather like Pikers with unicolor shirts and some families emphasize getting more simple in lifestyle, the Amos Martin people, especially among the young are influenced by Cowboy fashion trends (boots, hats upfolded). Even in head coverings differences are now more visible. Formerly it was quoted the Wenger Mennonites were covering ears completely, Reidenbach Mennonites just covered half of the ear. This cannot be said anymore for the conservatives of the John Martin side. The coverings of the Daniel M. Hoover group are of heavier material, look like linen.

While the mother group of all Reidenbach Mennonites the Groffdale Conference Mennonites is quoted as liberal, 35ers have such a tendency in life areas not expected, like having rather racing bikes (just among the Amos Martin side seen) then normal types.

At all, even their Ordnungen are changing and adapting to outside pressure, new inventions are discussed if allowable or having to be forbidden. The Daniel M. Hoover group,  a very conservative branch, allows solar panels of a certain size and reloads thereby small batteries in their sheds, while many of them still use old-style outhouses, non flushing water toilets. Henry M. Hoover's group had for example flushing water toilets allowed and get rid of them when a part were joining Gorrie Mennonites.

Due to some marriage problems resulting from splits (partners separated in church affiliations) two Reidenbach groups used the law for custody or visitation rights. This was done by the Kleine Reidenbach Gemeinde against a former Henry Hoover member unsuccessfully, and by the Daniel Hoover side against also a former member after 2014 successfully.
In these cases they used attorneys and left the traditional way of complete defenselessness and not using state powers in order to solve problems. In the latter case there was high pressure, so one side argued, to use lawyers because the case could not be solved otherwise. 
It is how ever traditional ruling that Mennonites shall not use any attorneys and bring people before courts. Other Reidenbach Mennonites still hold on to the old doctrine: being separate from the state, rather suffer, not solving problems via courts in all matters and not using state powers for own intentions, but they hadn´t to experience these clashes after a split, when husband and wife were separated and it was expected of them.

Marriage and disease 

There are basically four family names among the Reidenbachs: Martin, Hoover, Reiff and Nolt, because there was only a small founder group. 

Over the years two names were added, one by a marriage with an outsider who converted, then went with the Kleine Reidenbach church side and finally left, and one by a convert from the Wenger Mennonites who even became Prediger(minister), so that Reidenbach Mennonites are nowadays carry also names as Starr and Leid, both among the conservative groups. 

Among the "liberal" Amos Martin side they got a female convert who married a Thirty-Fiver man, so there was a  Mrs Reiff, who came "from the world". This couple left after some years. 
It is predictable that the Nolt name will die out among the 35ers, it is anyhow just among the Peter O. Nolt, Missouri group. This group has no young people anymore.

It is known that some other outsiders attended services and thought for some time to join, but finally left. Reidenbachs growth is therefore mainly by reproduction, not by conversions from the "Welt/world" as they would name it. Depending on groups and individuals some have been more open to befriend interested persons, others were rather more closed up and glad to see these persons left. This latter point of view even created a split among the Kleine Reidenbach Gemeinde.

In 2022 Reidenbach Mennonite had following surnames in numbers:

(0.5 means there is at least one widowed family included, counting just half. Two widowed families would count for 1.0, etc. A complete family would count for 1. In these family numbers several widowed families might be included. Survey is mainly based on data material of 2016 and 2017, so that the numbers of families surely have increased. Obituaries since 2016/7 have been included so far known too and reduced family number by 0.5 in each case a partner died. This survey shows therefore that two family names predominate, Reiffs never grew much and many left, Leid is a young converted man´s family and Starrs have already founded new families, so kids are grown-up and intermarried. The number of Leids will grow as kids enter Rumspring time.)

First cousin marriages are normally forbidden among Old Order Mennonites, but in the first years of the Reidenbachs the small size of the group led to a high percentage of such marriages, as young members could hardly find partners inside the church who were less close related and marrying outside the church was and is still no option because of the doctrine to marry "in the Lord", "among same believers". This permissive step to allow first cousins to marry was even supported by Old Testament examples, like in the case of Jacob. The traditional line of permission started with second cousins, this would have been disastrous for them if still kept.

From 1947 to 1965 therefore 83.3 percent of all marriages were first cousin marriages. The fast natural growth of the group improved the situation and from 1965 to 1977 only 5.9 percent of all marriages were first cousin marriages. The split in 1977 aggravated the situation again and the old problem arose anew. Therefore, the Reidenbachs are in all likelihood the most inbred group of Anabaptists.

Generally first cousin marriages are forbidden in Pennsylvania, Kentucky and Missouri, all three states also declare it void if happening, but these marriages exist anyhow. 

According to hearsay it was already answered on the request of relationship: "Yes, by Adam and Eve!", so bypassing the problem answering honestly by a joke. So far known they are getting no official licenses, if happening in first cousin cases it is due to negligence or misleading of the official. One also has to consider people do not ask too much anyhow, they look away at the registering office and are used that many people of same surnames marry each other among Mennonites Martins, among Amish in Lancaster County Stoltzfuses, which have the same ancestors, some one generation ago, others several. The Reidenbach Mennonite ministry of each group performs the ceremony of marrying first cousins anyhow, even if forbidden, and register them later, especially when they deal with farm purchases and deeds transfers. Their marriages are not announced to the public and therefore resemble common law marriages. In regard of their situation (having chances or none at all), they support the Bible verse to obey rather God (´s law) then man (´s). The Bible allows these marriages in the Old Testament, that is mandatory law restriction for them. It disallows other relationships, but first cousins are biblically permitted.

First cousin marriage are in many of the current conservative branches a normal happening. Among the Amos Martin group they are happening in fewer cases today.
Among the conservatives at least four groups have some couples which are double cousins in relationship to each other. The rate of double cousin marriages go up from 10% to about 60% in these groups. One has to add two separate couples which are related to each other the same way. In one group there is already a single couple, whose grandparents were first cousins, their parents double cousins and they are also double cousins to each other.

In most instances in all of these new formed groups with more than one family the rate of first cousin marriages increases fast over 30% during the years following. There is hardly any other choice if one wants to marry a sympathetic person. But even with this high degree of inbreeding, some families of the same condition genetically are affected hard, while others have just healthy children. Genetics call it clustering and research why some are so much affected and others not at all.

Looking to diseases due to high inbreeding rates, some of them have Hirschsprung's disease and Maple syrup urine disease. Financing hospital bills are becoming therefore for some groups a hard issue, even when other related groups help.

Membership 
Old quotes were: In 1994 there were about 300 adult members divided into 10 subgroups. In 2008/9 membership was about 375 in 10 subgroups. 
In 2015 the membership of all branches was 371 in 18 congregations and the total population was 740.

These numbers were just valid and accurate for 1994, all later years are estimations hardly based on qualified calculations. Even the number of congregations/churches/groups were two high. The Reidenbach Mennonites have a comparable high degree of growth like the Wenger Mennonites, their numbers are also doubling between about 17-22 years. There is a very low loss of numbers to the world and even due to problems finding some marriage partners among some groups (or even having no chances at all), the membership numbers must be much higher than 371 after 21 years (from 1991 to 2015), which would not even come close to any doubling, but means either the 35er stopped child birthing or masses left, which both took not place. So the last numbers are unreasonable.

Current countings show that the Reidenbach Mennonites have already reached the combined membership numbers of 758 in 2022.

There are existing 8 Reidenbach Mennonite groups or congregations with more than one family and 7 units of separated families who can be considered a church itself in 2022.

Bibliography 
 Karsten-Gerhard Albertsen: The History & Life of the Reidenbach Mennonites (Thirty Fivers). Morgantown, PA 1996.
 Mark Z. Hoover: The Inside Story. Leitchfield, KY 2011.
 Stephen Scott. An Introduction to Old Order and Conservative Mennonite Groups. Intercourse, PA 1996.

References

External links 
 Reidenbach Mennonite Church (Lancaster County, Pennsylvania, USA) in Global Anabaptist Mennonite Encyclopedia Online

Anabaptism
Mennonitism
Old Order Mennonites
Christianity in Pennsylvania
Religion in Lancaster, Pennsylvania
Amish, New Order
Christian organizations established in 1946
Anabaptist denominations established in the 20th century